Jones is a town in Oklahoma County, Oklahoma. It is named after Charles G. Jones, a three-time mayor of Oklahoma City. The population was 2,692 at the time of the 2010 census.

History

Early history
Jones was plotted as a townsite on April 22, 1898 by Luther F. Aldrich before the St. Louis and Oklahoma City Railroad constructed a line from Sapulpa to Oklahoma City. Aldrich named the town after his friend and business associate, Charles G. "Gristmill" Jones who was a three-time mayor of Oklahoma City. Jones later named his eldest son Luther.

Jones is located just south of the place that Washington Irving described as "The Ringing of Horses" in the book A Tour on the Prairies (1835).

Jones was incorporated as a city on January 4, 1909. The 1910 Census counted the population at 163.

2007 ice storm and Jones High School fire
In December 2007, a devastating ice storm hit much of Oklahoma. It resulted in a fire at Jones High School, causing the school to burn to the ground. The new school was finished in 2010, after taking three years to build. The new school has a commons area and a theatre for drama club.

Earthquakes
On August 27, 2009, there were six earthquakes, the strongest of which registering a 3.7 magnitude on the Richter Scale, which occurred at 9:09pm Central Standard Time.

On January 15, 2010, there were four earthquakes, the strongest of which registering a 4.0 magnitude on the Richter Scale, which occurred at 9:25am Central Standard Time.

On January 24, 2010, a magnitude 3.7 earthquake struck Jones at 1:15am Central Standard Time.

On February 27, 2010, a magnitude 4.1 earthquake struck, east of Oklahoma City at 4:22pm Central Standard Time, preceded by a foreshock of magnitude 3.1 farther west on February 26 at 3:02am local time.

Geography
Jones is located at  (35.564510, -97.290860).

Jones is located in the Cross Timbers ecoregion and the Frontier Country tourism region.

Demographics

As of the census of 2000, there were 2,517 people, 914 households, and 673 families residing in the town. There were 986 housing units at an average density of 72.2 per square mile (27.9/km2). The racial makeup of the town was 88.16% White, 4.41% African American, 3.34% Native American, 0.16% Asian, 0.60% from other races, and 3.34% from two or more races. Hispanic or Latino of any race were 2.94% of the population.

There were 914 households, out of which 34.7% had children under the age of 18 living with them, 57.9% were married couples living together, 11.5% had a female householder with no husband present, and 26.3% were non-families. 22.4% of all households were made up of individuals, and 9.0% had someone living alone who was 65 years of age or older. The average household size was 2.61 and the average family size was 3.04.

In the town, the population was spread out, with 25.0% under the age of 18, 9.3% from 18 to 24, 27.5% from 25 to 44, 24.5% from 45 to 64, and 13.7% who were 65 years of age or older. The median age was 38 years. For every 100 females, there were 97.9 males. For every 100 females age 18 and over, there were 96.8 males.

The median income for a household in the town was $36,806, and the median income for a family was $41,495. Males had a median income of $31,406 versus $23,393 for females. The per capita income for the town was $16,388. About 9.5% of families and 13.6% of the population were below the poverty line, including 16.6% of those under age 18 and 13.4% of those age 65 or over.

References

External links
 Encyclopedia of Oklahoma History and Culture - Jones
 Town of Jones City

Oklahoma City metropolitan area
Towns in Oklahoma County, Oklahoma
Towns in Oklahoma